Rick Rojatt  is a Canadian stuntman, and the inspiration for the Human Fly comic book character.

Stunt career 
Rojatt performed a 250 mph wingwalking stunt on top of a DC-8 airliner flown by Clay Lacy over the Mojave desert and Texas.

In 1977, Rojatt contracted a Hydrogen peroxide rocket powered Harley-Davidson Sportster motorcycle to be built to jump 27 school buses at the Montreal Olympic Stadium during a Gloria Gaynor concert beating Evel Knievel's record jump of 13 buses.  Although he was able to beat the record, he crashed the motorcycle and suffered a broken ankle and some other injuries. He then retired from public life.

References

External links 
AVWEB-YouTube Video interview of Clay Lacy flying the Human Fly
YouTube Interview
1977 Montreal Olympic Stadium jump
Where in the World is The Human Fly?

Canadian stunt performers
Year of birth missing (living people)
Living people
Place of birth missing (living people)
Possibly living people